Preugenes was a mythical king of Achaea in Greece. He was a descendant of King Lacedaemon of Sparta, and the son of Agenor. Preugenes was the father of Patreus who founded the city of Patras.

Notes

References 

 Pausanias, Description of Greece with an English Translation by W.H.S. Jones, Litt.D., and H.A. Ormerod, M.A., in 4 Volumes. Cambridge, MA, Harvard University Press; London, William Heinemann Ltd. 1918. . Online version at the Perseus Digital Library
 Pausanias, Graeciae Descriptio. 3 vols. Leipzig, Teubner. 1903.  Greek text available at the Perseus Digital Library.

External links

Ancient Greeks
Characters in Greek mythology

Mythology of Achaea